Kaća Čelan (born August 5, 1956 in Ratkovo, SR Serbia, FPR Yugoslavia) is a writer, director, theatre and acting expert, professor and actress. She is internationally known for being awarded the first prize for the best German-language play from the Bund der Theatergemeinden (Alliance of the German Theatre Community) for her play  among other awards.

Biography

Early life 
Kaća Čelan was born and grew up in Ratkovo (Odžaci), SR Serbia, FPR Yugoslavia; an area in the multicultural and multifaceted region of Vojvodina, dominated by five cultures and languages: Serbian, Hungarian, German, Ukrainian (Rusyn) and Czech, which influenced and shaped her early childhood. She graduated from the scientific high school in Odžaci and its rigorous classical curriculum with straight A's as best student of her generation.

Move to Sarajevo 
After finishing her high school education, she chose the city of Sarajevo as her "home of choice". Her studies in the Olympic metropolis included comparative literature, theatre studies, and acting at the University of Sarajevo. Following her studies, she founded Teatar Amfiteatar Sarajevo (TAS) theatre, which she ran for seven years. Čelan has also worked as a directing professor at the Academy for Scenic Arts, Sarajevo. Her awards have included Best Young Actress in Socialist Republic of Bosnia and Herzegovina, the Yugoslavian award for avant-garde Arts, and Best Director award at the Avant-garde Theatre Festival in Socialist Republic of Montenegro. She has been the production director of the International Theatre Festival in Kotor, Montenegro. As a theatre academic she held fellowships in Moscow and Vienna.

Slovenia and Germany 
Prior to the siege of Sarajevo, Čelan moved to Ljubljana, Slovenia, where she worked as a writer and director for a year. With a fellowship from the German cultural department and the Heinrich Böll Foundation in hand, she moved to Germany in 1993. In the Böll-House, she founded the TAS theatre in exile, and during its first project, Project 3, she toured well-known German theatres such as the Munich Kammerspiele and Hamburg's Thalia Theater. In 1999 she founded her acting school, the Čelan Theatre School at Burgau Castle, where her theatre was based as well. In 1995, Čelan won the first prize for the best German-language play from the Bund der Theatergemeinden (Alliance of the German Theatre Community) for her play . That was followed by the International Award, Kristal Vilenice, for poetry in 1996. The next year the Cultural Minister of North Rhine-Westphalia awarded her the prize in theatre literature.

New York and Los Angeles 
In 2008, Čelan re-established Theater TAS in New York City with the performance and installation Yard Sale: New Footfalls... as its first production, presented by the arts organization chashama. She is a member of PEN American Center.

The Theater TAS production of Rainer Werner Fassbinder's play "Blood on the Cat's Neck" directed by Čelan was presented in March 2014 by the Goethe-Institut LA as a multimedia theater and film performance. On June 28, 2014, the Max Kade Institute at the University of Southern California hosted the multimedia reading of Čelan's play "Woyzeck von Sarajevo" under her direction.

Works 
Čelan's plays have been performed on the German radio and in theatres. In addition to her own plays, such as The Last Story, Woyzeck from Sarajevo (both translated into English) and Struwwelpit & Co., she has directed twenty plays by classical authors, including Anton Chekhov, William Shakespeare, Edward Albee, Franz Kafka, Sophocles, and Samuel Beckett, in her theatre. Her works have been published in English, German and Serbo-Croatian. Čelan has translated texts written by Sylvia Plath, Leonid Andreyev and Isak Samokovlija among others.

Drama
 The Death of Omer & Merima
 The Royal Marine
 The King’s Murderers
 Heimatbuch (Homeland Book)
 Commedia Goldoniana
 The Last Story (translated into English)
 Chekhov
 Woyzeck from Sarajevo (translated into English)
 Felix
 Cabaret International
 The Struwwelpit & Co. (in collaboration with Maria Fuß)
 Picollo Fratello Francesco

Other
 Woyzeck from Sarajevo (radio play)
 Clean Hands (book)

Awards 
 Best Young Actress in SR Bosnia and Herzegovina
 Yugoslavian Award for Avant-garde Arts
 Best Director Award at the Avant-garde Theatre Festival in SR Montenegro
 Dramatist Award of the Bund der Theatergemeinden (Alliance of the German Theatre Community) for the best German-language play for her play Heimatbuch (Homeland Book), 1995
 Kristal Vilenice, International Literature Award for Poetry, for her book Me and You – Book of Love Poetry, 1996
 Artist Award of the Cultural Minister of the State of North Rhine-Westphalia (NRW) in the field of Theatre Literature, 1997

References

External links 
 Theater TAS Official Website
 
 Rhizome Artist Profile
 Theater TAS on Vimeo

1956 births
Living people
People from Odžaci
Bosnia and Herzegovina actresses
Women dramatists and playwrights
Bosnia and Herzegovina people of Serbian descent
Bosnia and Herzegovina emigrants to Germany
German people of Serbian descent
German emigrants to the United States
American people of Serbian descent
American people of Bosnia and Herzegovina descent